Jotun may refer to:

 Jötunn, a type of entity in Germanic mythology
 Jotun (company), a Norwegian company
 "Jotun", a song by In Flames
 Jotun (video game), a 2015 video game developed by Thunder Lotus Games